Sigit Budiarto (born 24 November 1975) is a male badminton player from Indonesia noted for his reflexes and deft handling of the racket. A men's doubles specialist, he won numerous international titles between 1995 and 2005, most of them in partnership with Candra Wijaya. He was a member of Indonesia's world champion Thomas Cup (men's international) teams of 1998, 2000 and 2002.  Budiarto shared the World Men's Doubles title with Wijaya in 1997 and they were runners-up in this event in 2003 and 2005. They claimed the prestigious All-England Championship in 2003. Among other titles, Budiarto has won doubles at the Asian Championships (in 2004 with Trikus Haryanto), and at the French (1995), Indonesia (1997, 2001); Malaysia (2001, 2005); China (1996, 2004, 2005); Japan (2001); and Singapore (1997, 1998, 2005, 2006) Opens.

In 1998, Budiarto received a two-year doping ban for taking the anabolic steroid nandrolone.

Achievements

World Championships 
Men's doubles

World Cup 
Men's doubles

Asian Championships 
Men's doubles

Southeast Asian Games 
Men's doubles

World Junior Championships 
Boys' doubles

IBF World Grand Prix 
The World Badminton Grand Prix sanctioned by International Badminton Federation (IBF) since 1983.

Men's doubles

 IBF Grand Prix tournament
 IBF Grand Prix Finals tournament

References

External links
 
 

1975 births
Living people
People from Yogyakarta
Sportspeople from Special Region of Yogyakarta
Indonesian male badminton players
Badminton players at the 2004 Summer Olympics
Olympic badminton players of Indonesia
Badminton players at the 2002 Asian Games
Asian Games silver medalists for Indonesia
Asian Games medalists in badminton
Medalists at the 2002 Asian Games
Competitors at the 1997 Southeast Asian Games
Competitors at the 2001 Southeast Asian Games
Southeast Asian Games gold medalists for Indonesia
Southeast Asian Games silver medalists for Indonesia
Southeast Asian Games medalists in badminton
World No. 1 badminton players
Badminton coaches
Indonesian sportspeople in doping cases
Doping cases in badminton
20th-century Indonesian people